The 2011 Melon Music Awards were held on Thursday, November 24, 2011, at the Olympic Gymnastics Arena in Seoul, South Korea, the event's first use of the venue. Organized by Kakao M through its online music store Melon, the 2011 ceremony was the third installment of the event since its offline launch in 2009. Beast, IU and 2NE1 received the most nominations at the ceremony, have each been nominated five times. The trio along with Super Junior were the only artists who received multiple accolades, with all four artists winning two awards each. Furthermore, the aforementioned trio won the three daesang prizes at the event.

Performers

Presenters 
 Park Shin-hye, Leeteuk & Yoon Doo-joon – Official host
 Kim Sung-soo & Kim Seon-woo – Best New Artist
 Kim Hyun-joong & Woori – Best Music Video
 Lim Tae-kyung & Cha Ji-yeon – Best Songwriter
 Lee Kwang-soo & Han Chae-ah – Hot Trend Award (Variety)
 Choi Hyo-sung – Hot Issue Segment
 Nam Tae-jeong & Moon Ji-ye – MBC Music Star Award
 Ki Tae-young & Jin Bora – Best R&B/Ballad Award
 Lee Eun-gyeol & Lee Hee-jin – Best OST Award
 Jung Seung-ho & Kim Se-ah – Culture Performer Award
 Hong Jong-hyun & Kim Kyung-jin – Best Rock Award & Best Rap/Hip Hop Award
 Nam Hee-suk & Lee Ji-seon – Netizen Popularity Award & Global Artist Award
 Bang Si-hyuk & Song Kyung-ah – Album of the Year
 Bae Cheol-soo – Artist of the Year & Song of the Year

Winners and nominees

Main awards 
Winners and nominees are listed below. Winners are listed first and emphasized in bold.

Other awards

References

External links 

 Official website

2011 music awards
Melon Music Awards ceremonies
Annual events in South Korea